Ola Brynhildsen (born 27 April 1999) is a Norwegian professional footballer who plays as midfielder for Eliteserien club Molde FK.

Career
On 4 May 2020, Molde announced the singing of Brynhildsen to a -year contract, starting from 1 July 2020. On 20 May 2020, Molde and Stabæk concluded the deal.

Personal life
He is a son of Rune Brynhildsen.

Career statistics

Honours
Molde
 Eliteserien: 2022
 Norwegian Cup: 2021–22

References

1999 births
Living people
Sportspeople from Bærum
Norwegian footballers
Norway youth international footballers
Norway under-21 international footballers
Association football midfielders
Stabæk Fotball players
Molde FK players
Eliteserien players